Nandi Awards presented annually by Government of Andhra Pradesh. First awarded in 1964.

1964 Nandi Awards Winners List

References

1964
1964 Indian film awards